Young River is in the Otago region of the South Island of New Zealand. It lies within the Mount Aspiring National Park and feeds into the Makarora River  upriver from Makarora.

Course
The ultimate source of the Young River is at the head of Young River North Branch on the eastern slopes of Mount Doris on the main divide of the Southern Alps / Kā Tiritiri o te Moana. The river flow eastwards from it source. The Gillespie Pass Circuit tramping track crosses the river using the Young Fork Bridge.

2007 Landslide
At 4:40 a.m. on August 29 2007, a  debris avalanche occurred blocking the Young River North Branch. A new lake began forming behind the dam. The lake eventually overtopped the dam on 5 October 2007.

See also
List of rivers of New Zealand

References

Rivers of Otago
Mount Aspiring National Park
Rivers of New Zealand